Dake Subdistrict is a subdistrict of Louxing District, Loudi, Hunan Province, People's Republic of China. The building of Loudi Municipal Government lies in the subdistrict.

Administrative division
The subdistrict is divided into 5 villages and 10 community, the following areas: 
 Dake Community
 Xiaoke Community
 Luojia Community
 Huangni Community
 Jingtou Community
 Dawu Community
 Nanlong Community
 Daxin Community
 Zaoyuan Community
 Sanyuan Community
 Shuiyang Village
 Futan Village
 Pingshi Village
 Fangshi Village
 Sile Village

Geography

The Sun Stream, a tributary of Lishui River, flows through the subdistrict.

Economy
The local economy is primarily based upon commerce and local industry.

Transportation
Loudi West railway station and Loudi South Bus station serve the town.

Railway
The Luoyang–Zhanjiang Railway, from Luoyang City, Henan Province to Zhanjiang City, Guangdong Province runs through the subdistrict.

The Shanghai–Kunming railway, more commonly known as "Hukun railway", is a west-east railway passing through the subdistrict.

Attractions
The Park of Sun Stream is a public park within the subdistrict.

References

External links

Divisions of Louxing District